Kima is a genus of spiders in the family Salticidae (jumping spiders).

Species
, the World Spider Catalog accepted the following species:
 Kima africana Peckham & Peckham, 1902 – South Africa
 Kima atra Wesołowska & Russell-Smith, 2000 – Tanzania
 Kima montana Wesołowska & Szeremeta, 2001 – Kenya
 Kima reimoseri (Lessert, 1927) – Republic of Congo
 Kima variabilis Peckham & Peckham, 1903 – South Africa

References

Salticidae
Salticidae genera
Spiders of Africa